Iver Johan Knotten (born 17 December 1998) is a Norwegian cyclist, who currently rides for UCI Continental team . His father, Jon Erik Knotten, was also a cyclist.

Major results 
2015
 2nd Road race, National Junior Road Championships
2016
 1st  Time trial, National Junior Road Championships
 1st Overall Niedersachsen-Rundfahrt der Junioren
1st Stage 2a (ITT)
 3rd Time trial, European Junior Road Championships
 6th Time trial, UCI Junior Road World Championships
 9th Overall Trophée Centre Morbihan
1st Stage 2 (ITT)
 9th Overall Course de la Paix Juniors
1st Stage 2a (ITT)
2019
 2nd Time trial, National Road Championships
 4th Time trial, European Under-23 Road Championships
2020
 4th Time trial, National Road Championships

References

External links

Norwegian male cyclists
Living people
1998 births